Various vertical runs, or tower running races, have been conducted in Vietnam:

 30 October 2011, Ho Chi Minh City: Bitexco Vertical Run; Thomas Dold won in the men's competition, Valentina Belotti won the women's competition.

 09 July 2016, Hanoi: Landmark 72 building

 29 October 2017, Ho Chi Minh City: HCMC Skyrun at Bitexco Financial Tower
 28 October 2018, Ho Chi Minh City: HCMC Skyrun at Bitexco Financial Tower
 27 October 2019, Ho Chi Minh City: HCMC Skyrun at Bitexco Financial Tower
 30 October 2022, Ho Chi Minh City: HCMC Skyrun at Bitexco Financial Tower

See also
Sport in Vietnam

References

External links
Official Website of the HCMC SKYRUN

Sport in Vietnam
Tower running competitions